Clarkenia basilinea is a species of moth of the family Tortricidae. It is found in Ecuador (Loja Province).

References

External links

Moths described in 2001
Endemic fauna of Ecuador
Euliini
Moths of South America
Taxa named by Józef Razowski